The 2016 Banja Luka Challenger was a professional tennis tournament played on clay courts. It was the fifteenth edition of the tournament which was part of the 2016 ATP Challenger Tour. It took place in Banja Luka, Bosnia and Herzegovina from 12 to 18 September 2016.

Singles main-draw entrants

Seeds

 1 Rankings are as of August 29, 2016.

Other entrants
The following players received wildcards into the singles main draw:
  Viktor Durasovic
  Antonio Šančić
  Nikola Mektić
  Pablo Andújar

The following player received entry into the singles main draw with a protected ranking:
  Nikola Čačić

The following players received entry from the qualifying draw:
  Maximilian Neuchrist
  Filip Veger
  Sebastian Ofner
  Lenny Hampel

Champions

Singles

 Adam Pavlásek def.   Miljan Zekić, 3–6, 6–1, 6–4.

Doubles

 Roman Jebavý /  Jan Šátral def.  Andrea Arnaboldi /  Maximilian Neuchrist, 7–6(7–2) 4–6, [10–7].

External links
Official Website

2016 in Bosnia and Herzegovina sport
Banja Luka Challenger
Banja Luka Challenger
September 2016 sports events in Europe